Li Boxi (born 30 October 2000) is a Chinese footballer currently playing as a forward for Beijing Guoan.

Career statistics

Club
.

References

2000 births
Living people
Chinese footballers
Association football forwards
Beijing Guoan F.C. players